Nette can refer to:

Rivers
 Nette (Innerste), a river in Lower Saxony, Germany, tributary to the Innerste
 Nette (Hase), a river in Lower Saxony, Germany, tributary to the Hase
 Nette (Middle Rhine), a river in Rhineland-Palatinate, Germany, tributary to the Rhine
 Nette (Lenne), a river in North Rhine-Westphalia, Germany, tributary to the Lenne
 Nette (Niers), a river in North Rhine-Westphalia, Germany, tributary to the Niers
 Nette (Alme), a river in North Rhine-Westphalia, Germany, tributary to the Alme

Other
 Nette Framework, a PHP framework for creating web applications
 Theodor Nette (1895 or 1896 – 1926), a Soviet diplomatic courier of NKID
 Nette Edel Pils, a German beer brand of the Koblenzer Brauerei
 Nette, a district of Bockenem, in Lower Saxony, Germany

See also

Netta (disambiguation)
Netti (disambiguation)
Nettie (disambiguation)
Netty (disambiguation)